The B. Thomas Golisano College of Computing and Information Sciences is one of the largest colleges at the Rochester Institute of Technology (RIT), and is home to the institute's computing education and research facilities. Golisano College is home to RIT's computer science, computing security, information sciences and technologies, and software engineering departments, and to the Ph.D. program in computing and information sciences, and the School of Interactive Games & Media.
Golisano College is housed in a 125,000 square foot facility, opened in 2003 on RIT's campus in Rochester, New York.

History
In 1972, RIT began offering one of its first computer science programs. Originally named computer systems, the program offered students the opportunity to earn a bachelor of technology degree. In 1996, RIT introduced an undergraduate program in software engineering, one of the first programs of its kind. Later, in 2003, the software engineering program would become one of the first such programs to receive ABET accreditation.

In the late 1990s, the dean of RIT's College of Applied Science and Technology, made a proposition to create a new college that would focus on the growing fields of computer science, information technology and software engineering. In February 2001, B. Thomas Golisano, chairman and CEO of Paychex, donated $14 million to fund the college's creation. The college was founded on July 1, 2001 and officially opened in May 2003. The first dean of the college was Jorge Díaz Herrera.

In 2005, former President Bill Clinton visited the college following an invitation from B. Thomas Golisano. He toured the facilities and gave a speech to students. Also in 2005, the college established nation's first lab for social computing as part of a new research initiative, the Center for Advancing the Study of Cyberinfrastructure. In addition, McAfee donated more than $1 million in technology to the college to be used as part of a new master's degree program in computer security and information assurance.

On July 1, 2009, in recognition of the growing fields of game design and development, the School of Interactive Games & Media was founded. The school has since become a national leader in game design and development education having been ranked 4th in the nation in undergraduate and graduate game design and development education by the Princeton Review.

In 2012, Andrew Sears became the second dean of the college.

In 2012, the college introduced its computing security department, dedicated to the increasing importance of protecting computing devices and computer data.

In 2015, Anne Haake was named interim dean of the college, and Andrew Sears became dean of the College of Information Sciences and Technology at Penn State.

Facilities

The Golisano College is housed within a three-floor, 126,500 sq. ft. facility that features three cube sculptures created by famed artist Harry Bertoia, that house trees that stretch up through the atrium. There are 13 classrooms, 12 studio teaching labs, and 16 dedicated labs at the college, offering access to the study of every major computing platform. The college's dedicated Security Lab is isolated from the rest of the campus's networks to allow the in-depth study of viruses, firewalls, and other computer vulnerabilities. Additional labs include an Entertainment Lab for 3D modeling, game and interactive media development; a Mobile Computing and Robotics Lab for the research and development of portable devices; and an Artificial Intelligence lab dedicated to the understanding of human reactions and processing. The College also features its own deli: Ctrl-Alt-Deli.

Awards and recognition
In 2013, Golisano College's cyber defense team won the National Collegiate Cyber Defense Competition.
In 2013, the School of Interactive Games & Media's game design and developments programs at both the bachelor's and master's levels were ranked fourth in the nation by the Princeton Review.
The college has been named a National Center of Academic Excellence in Information Assurance Education by the U.S. Department of Homeland Security, National Security Agency, and the Information Assurance Directorate.

Notable alumni
 Katie Linendoll (2005), TV host, producer and tech expert
 Alex Kipman (2001), primary inventor of Microsoft HoloLens and Kinect for Xbox 360
 John Resig (2006), founder of jQuery

References

External links
 

Rochester Institute of Technology colleges
Computer science departments in the United States
Information schools
Educational institutions established in 2001
2001 establishments in New York (state)